Jay D. Hill  (born December 27, 1952) is a Canadian politician who served as the Conservative Member of Parliament (MP) for the riding of Prince George—Peace River in British Columbia from 1993 to 2010. He served as Government House Leader in the House of Commons during his tenure (2008–2010). On July 21, 2010, Hill announced that he would be retiring at the May 2011 federal election. In October 2010, he announced he would retire on October 25, 2010. He recently served as the interim leader of the Maverick Party from 2020-2022.

One of Hill's private members bills resulted in the Adoption Expense Tax Credit, introduced in the 2005 federal budget.   His bill called for tax breaks for couples who adopt children.

Hill retired from politics on October 25, 2010. He was honoured at a retirement dinner in Fort St. John, attended by Prime Minister Stephen Harper, BC Premier Christy Clark, Reform Party of Canada founder and former Opposition Leader Preston Manning and numerous other colleagues and friends.

Ethics violations

Shortly after his retirement, Hill was found to have breached ethics rules in the Conflict of Interest Act when took advantage of his previous position and contacted ex-colleagues about a forthcoming multinational energy deal. Canada's federal ethics watchdog found that Hill used his former position to facilitate access to the ministers on behalf of his spouse, Leah Murray, and her employer, National Public Relations, a firm that had drafted a communications plan for the deal.

Western Canadian separatism

On June 23, 2020, it was announced that following a Zoom conference, Hill was selected as the new leader of the Wexit Canada Party, a political party that has as its stated goal the creation of an independent country in Western Canada. The party's name was later changed to the Maverick Party in September.

Electoral history

References

External links 

1952 births
Canadian Alliance MPs
Conservative Party of Canada MPs
Living people
Members of the House of Commons of Canada from British Columbia
Members of the King's Privy Council for Canada
People from Fort St. John, British Columbia
Reform Party of Canada MPs
Members of the 28th Canadian Ministry
Maverick Party politicians
Western Canadian separatists
Politicians affected by a party expulsion process